The Military Technical Courier is a multidisciplinary peer-reviewed scientific journal published quarterly by the University of Defence in Belgrade. It is a military science focused journal covering a wide range of scientific, professional and technical topics. Its articles are dedicated to fundamental and applied science and R&D applicable in military science, as well as to  practical technical achievements in the field.
The owners of the journal are the Ministry of Defence and the Serbian Armed Forces.

Scope 
The focus and scope of the journal are:
 military technologies and applied sciences
 mathematics
 mechanics
 computer sciences
 materials
 chemical technology
 electronics
 telecommunications
 IT
 mechanical engineering

History 
The first printed issue of the Military Technical Courier was published on 1 January 1953. Prior to its release, five irregularly published magazines (Artillery Courier, Tank Courier, Military Engineering Courier, Courier of Engineering and Chemical Units of the Yugoslav Army, Courier of Communications and Logistics and Support of the Yugoslav Army) used to cover military topics between 1947 and the beginning of 1953. This regular monthly journal, the Military Technical Courier, had approximately 1,000  pages a year.

The Courier focused on different technological areas of interest for the Army (e.g. military, engineering, communications, etc.) as well as on army services and organisational issues (e.g. logistics, supplies and provisions, transportation, medical and veterinary topics, education and training, etc.). The latest technological news and reports from foreign armies were given in separate sections.

Between 1958 and 1973, the Military Technical Courier reflected the changes in the Army branches and services by introducing new sections on engines, overhauling, fuels, rocket technique, weapons, ordnance, ammunition, corrosion protection, protective and fire service equipment, geodesy, standards, etc. Supplements on particular topics were frequently published.

The Journal has its printed and electronic form. The first electronic edition of the Military Technical Courier appeared on the Internet on 1 January 2011. All articles are peer reviewed. The Ministry of Education, Science and Technological Development of the Republic of Serbia has included the Military Technological Courier in its evaluation reports in the following areas: mathematics, mechanics, computer sciences, electronics, telecommunications, mechanical engineering, materials science, chemical technology and IT.

Editors 
Dragan Pamučar.

Former editors of the Military Technical Courier:
 Col Dobrivoje Avramović (No 1/1953 and from No 7/1960 to No 9/1960),
 Col Vojislav M. Ilić (from No 2/1953 to No 6/1960),
 Col Zdravko Verbić (from No 10/1960 to No 5/1966),
 Col Slavko Čolić (from No 6/1966 to No 7/1968), 
 Col Radisav Brajović (from No 8/1968 to 6/1973),
 Col Stanimir Ćirić (from No 1/1974 to No 3/1974),
 Lt Col Nikola Zorić (from No 4/1974 to No 3/1978),
 Col Miroslav Ćojbašić (from No 4/1978 to 6/1989 and from No3-4/1994 to No 2/2000), 
 Col Tomislav Štulić (from No 1/1990 to No 6/1991),
 Col Živojin Grujić MSc (from No 1/1992 to No 6/1993),
 Lt Col Vladimir Ristić (from No 1/1994 to No 2/1994),
 Col Stevan Josifović (from No 3/2000 to No 1/2007),
 Lt Col Nebojša Gaćeša MSc (from No 2/2007 to No 2/2021),
 Lt Col Dragan Pamučar PhD (from No 3/2021).

Publication policy 
Military Technical Courier is an Open Access journal, which means that all content is freely available without charge to the user or his/her institution. Users are allowed to read, download, copy, distribute, print, search, or link to the full texts of the articles, or use them for any other lawful purpose, without asking prior permission from the publisher or the author. This is in accordance with the BOAI definition of open access. It uses the Creative Commons Attribution (CC BY) license. It is indexed by the Directory of Open Access Journals.

Awards
For its contributions to the Army, the Military Technical Courier was awarded on several occasions (in 1977, it received the Order of Military Merit with Great Star; in 2002, the Order of the Yugoslav Army 3rd Class for its 50th anniversary and in 2012 with the Military Memorial Medal).

References 

Military journals
Serbian-language journals
Military of Serbia
Military technology